Connor John Emerton (born 5 June 1994) is an English former first-class cricketer.

Emerton was born at Hillingdon in June 1994. He was educated at Parmiter's School, before going up to Jesus College, Cambridge. While studying at Cambridge, Emerton made two appearances in first-class cricket in 2016. The first came for Cambridge MCCU against Nottinghamshire at Fenner's, while the second came for Cambridge University against Oxford University at Oxford. In addition to playing first-class cricket in 2016, he also appeared in  minor counties cricket for Hertfordshire, making a single appearance in the 2016 Minor Counties Championship.

References

External links

1994 births
Living people
People from Hillingdon
People educated at Parmiter's School, Garston
Alumni of Jesus College, Cambridge
English cricketers
Cambridge MCCU cricketers
Cambridge University cricketers
Hertfordshire cricketers